Lafaille is a French surname. Notable people with the surname include:

Bernard Lafaille (1900–1955), French engineer
Jean-Christophe Lafaille (1965–2006), French mountain climber

French-language surnames
Surnames of French origin